The Freedom Party of Ontario is a political party in Ontario, Canada.

The party ran twenty-four candidates in the 2003 provincial election.  Information about these candidates may be found on this page.

Wally Dove (Brampton Centre)
Full name is Wallace Maxwell Raymond Dove.  Dove is a former Certified General Accountant who had his license revoked by the Certified General Accountants of Ontario for his promotion of unlawful detax schemes.  He now has an injunction against him prohibiting him from continuing to attempt to use his previous CGA credentials.  Formerly a tax auditor with the Canada Customs and Revenue Agency.  Now a member of Canada's small "Tax Refusal" (or DeTax) movement, members of which refuse to pay income tax, claiming that such taxation is illegal under Canadian law (very few people, and no court authorities, accept the arguments of this group).

Dove is an ally and frequent collaborator of Daniel Lavigne, who has promoted the "Tax Refusal" position extensively on Canadian political newsgroups.  In 2000, Dove criticized bankers for many of the world's ills. Was arrested for tax evasion in 2004 after claiming false losses in a partnership.  Attempted to have the case dismissed, on the grounds that no legal income tax act exists in Canada.  This objection was dismissed by the presiding judge.

Received 356 votes, finishing fifth in a field of five candidates.  The winner was Linda Jeffrey of the Ontario Liberal Party.

John G. Purdy (Brampton West—Mississauga)
Purdy is a computer consultant, and has described himself as a part-time poet and composer (Globe and Mail, 20 December 1999).  He has written numerous letters to Canada's major newspapers on a variety of issues.  In 2000, he wrote a letter to the National Post complaining of State Capitalism in Canada (National Post, 3 April 2000).  He has also written that the right of businesses to profit is "fundamental and inalienable" (Toronto Star, 29 March 2000).  In 2002, he accused Canada's business community of not being sufficiently supportive of free enterprise (National Post, 22 July 2002).  He has also written a defence of pornography as free expression (National Post, 25 March 2000).

He voted for the Progressive Conservative Party in the 1995 general election, and subsequently argued that the PCs more closely approximated his views than did the other major parties (Globe and Mail, 8 August 1997).

His chief financial officer in 2003 was Paul Blair, another Freedom Party candidate.  He received 266 votes (0.4%), finishing sixth in a field of six candidates.  The winner was Vic Dhillon of the Ontario Liberal Party.

David Rodman (Chatham-Kent—Essex)
Has been a member of the Freedom Party since at least 1995.  Assisted the Freedom Party campaign in the 1995 provincial election.  Received 281 votes, finishing fifth in a field of five candidates.  The winner was Pat Hoy of the Ontario Liberal Party.

Franz Cauchi (Davenport)
Owns a marketing business.  Has been a member of the Freedom Party since at least 1995.  Assisted the Freedom Party campaign in the 1995 provincial election.  Supports a change in Ontario law, allowing greater access to adoption information by children and parents.  Received 264 votes, finishing sixth in a field of seven candidates. The winner was Tony Ruprecht of the Ontario Liberal Party. Cauchi is the FpO's candidate in the March 30, 2006 provincial by-election in Toronto—Danforth.

Wayne Simmons (Don Valley East)
Philosophical objectivist, a follower of Ayn Rand.  Has also quoted F.A. Hayek on occasion.  Simmons has written several articles summarizing his beliefs on philosophy-oriented newsgroups.  Opposes government involvement in matters such as health provision, rent control, social welfare, drug prohibition and abortion provision.  An atheist, opposes the idea of "Christian libertarianism".  Was elected to the provincial council of the Freedom Party on February 13, 2005, having previously served as a provincial councillor.  First ran for the Freedom Party in the 1999 provincial election in Don Valley East and received 53 votes, finishing ninth in a field of ten candidates.  The winner was David Caplan of the Ontario Liberal Party.  Improved his total to 119 votes in the 2003 election, though this was still the lowest vote total of any Freedom Party candidate in the province.  Finished sixth in a field of six candidates.  Caplan again won the riding.

He was the party's candidate in the provincial by-election on November 24, 2005, in Scarborough—Rouge River. He won 59 votes (0.4% of the total), placing last in a field of seven candidates. Bas Balkissoon won the riding for the Liberal Party.

Cathy McKeever (Durham)
Joined the Reform Party of Canada in 1990, claims the Freedom Party of Ontario has similar goals.  Describes herself as a business woman, library board member, hiker, environmentalist, soccer fan, Thatcher fan and Beatlemaniac. Has also campaigned for municipal office.  She is anti-abortion, but does not support conscience rights for medical practitioners who oppose abortion. Received 707 votes, finishing fifth in a field of five candidates.  The winner was John O'Toole of the Progressive Conservative Party of Ontario.

Ray Monteith (Elgin—Middlesex—London)
Perennial candidate.  Lives in St. Thomas.  Former longtime  president of the local Freedom Party riding association.  Originally a Progressive Conservative, but voted for the Liberals in the 1985 provincial election.  Has campaigned for the Freedom Party in every provincial election since 1987, and frequently polls above the party's provincial average.  Born August 21, 1920.  A devout Seventh-day Adventist, and a former railway worker at Conrail for 38 years.  Acted as a foster father to 175 children over a twenty-year period.  Supports the full legalization of drugs, and once compared Canadian former cabinet minister Allan Rock to Deng Xiaoping for his refusal to consider an end to Canada's prohibition laws.  Has also written against pay equity and in favour of legalized Sunday shopping.  Opposes same-sex marriage and euthanasia, and supports health workers being able to deny assistance to women seeking lawful access to abortion.  Received 671 votes, finishing fifth in a field of five candidates.  The winner was Steve Peters of the Ontario Liberal Party.

Previous candidacies:
 1987 Ontario general election, Elgin, 546 votes, fifth out of five candidates (winner: Marietta Roberts, Liberal)
 1990 Ontario general election, Elgin, 1,104 votes, fourth out of four candidates (winner: Peter North, Ontario New Democratic Party)
 1995 Ontario general election, Elgin, 565 votes, fifth out of five candidates (winner: Peter North, Independent)
 1999 Ontario general election, Elgin—Middlesex—London, 405 votes, fourth out of six candidates (winner: Steve Peters, Liberal)

Charles Olito (Haliburton—Victoria—Brock)
Perennial candidate.  Has campaigned for no fewer than five registered political parties.  Lives in Mariposa, and lists his occupation as a farmer.  Previously a teacher.  Graduated from the University of Toronto's Teacher's College in 1969, and taught in that city.  Also served in the Royal Canadian Air Force.  Supports monetary reform, and has argued that Canada's Goods and Services Tax (GST) is illegal.

Ran for the Progressive Conservative Party of Ontario in the 1987 provincial election, and received 798 votes in Parkdale for a distant third-place finish.  The winner was Tony Ruprecht of the Ontario Liberal Party.  Olito was also a candidate in the 1988 North York municipal election, finishing fifth against Anthony Perruzza in the city's fifth ward.

Later ran as a candidate of the Ontario Provincial Confederation of Regions Party in the 1995 provincial election, and received 151 votes in the riding of Victoria—Haliburton, finishing sixth in a field of six candidates.  The winner on that occasion was Chris Hodgson of the Progressive Conservative Party of Ontario.

First ran for the Freedom Party in the 1999 provincial election, and received 135 votes in Haliburton—Victoria—Brock; Hodgson again won the riding.  In the 2003 campaign, received 273 votes and again finished sixth in a field of six candidates.  The winner was Laurie Scott of the Progressive Conservative Party.

He has also campaigned for federal office on four occasions:
 Ran in Victoria—Haliburton in the 1993 federal election as a candidate of the Canada Party, and finished last in a field of nine candidates with 178 votes.  The winner was John O'Reilly of the Liberal Party of Canada.
 Ran again for the Canada Party in Hamilton East in a 1996 by-election, and finished twelfth in a field of thirteen candidates with 52 votes.  The winner on that occasion was Sheila Copps.
 In the 1997 federal election, campaigned again in Victoria—Haliburton as a candidate of Paul Hellyer's Canadian Action Party, and finished last in a field of five candidates with 504 votes; O'Reilly again won the riding.
 In the 2004 federal election, he ran as an independent candidate and received 330 votes, finishing last in a field of six candidates.  The winner was Barry Devolin of the Conservative Party of Canada.

In the 2006 municipal election, he ran as a candidate for the city council of the City of Kawartha Lakes in Ward 8 on a platform proposing de-amalgamation of that city. He placed third of three candidates with 89 votes, behind Donna Villemaire (1050 votes) and Ron Jenkins  (486 votes).

He is the Freedom Party's candidate in Haliburton—Kawartha Lakes—Brock in the 2011 provincial election.

Robert Sabharwal (Huron—Bruce)
Was 26 years old, and an undergraduate student in Chemistry and Biochemistry at the University of Western Ontario at the time of the election.  Raised in St. Thomas, Ontario, though he lived in Sarnia on a co-op placement during the election.  Chief financial officer was Paul Blair, another Freedom Party candidate.  Received 127 votes, finishing last in a field of six candidates.  The winner was Carol Mitchell of the Ontario Liberal Party.

Wayne Forbes (Lambton—Kent—Middlesex)
Perennial candidate.  Owns Forbes Fresh Fish in Grand Bend, Ontario.  Large and heavyset, despises political correctness.  Has called for the legalization of marijuana, and admits to pot smoking.  Supported the Reform Party of Canada at the federal level.  Has also accused the federal government of "cav[ing] in" to demands by native groups, and returning land expropriated in previous years.  Also opposed calling an inquiry into the death of Dudley George, claiming George was a violent protester.  Received 780 votes, finishing sixth in a field of six candidates.  The winner was Maria Van Bommel of the Ontario Liberal Party.  Received the highest vote totals of any Freedom Party candidate in the 1999 and 2003 elections.

Not to be confused with the Wayne Forbes, Project Manager from Sydney, Australia.

Previous candidacies:
 1995 Ontario general election, Lambton, 417 votes, fifth out of five candidates (winner: Marcel Beaubien, Progressive Conservative Party of Ontario)
 1999 Ontario general election, Lambton—Kent—Middlesex, 1,076 votes, fourth out of four candidates (winner: Marcel Beaubien, Progressive Conservative)

Lisa Turner (London North Centre)
Opposes excessive taxation, and promised to end the province's energy tax cap.  Also supports "choice" in education, a term normally used by those favouring privatization.  Received 242 votes, finishing last in a field of six candidates.  The winner was Deb Matthews of the Ontario Liberal Party.

Mike Davidson (London—Fanshawe)
A computer science lecturer at the University of Western Ontario.  Joined the Freedom Party in the 1990s, and did considerable work in designing the party's web pages.  Received 493 votes, finishing last in a field of five candidates.  The winner was Khalil Ramal of the Ontario Liberal Party.

Bill Frampton (London West)
A computer software developer in London. Frampton has endorsed guaranteed private property rights as a means of improving Canada's environment. Received 460 votes, the winner was Liberal Party candidate Chris Bentley.

Paul McKeever (Oshawa)
Party leader.  See his biography page for further details.  Received 518 votes, finishing fifth in a field of six candidates.  The winner was Jerry Ouellette of the Progressive Conservative Party of Ontario.

Matt Szymanowicz (Ottawa Centre)
A private in the Canadian Forces Primary Reserve as a weapons technician living in Ottawa. Also active with the Ontario Rifle Association.  Received 218 votes, finishing sixth out of seven candidates.  The winner was Richard Patten of the Ontario Liberal Party.

Paul Blair (Oxford)
A firefighter in London, Ontario.  49 years old in 2003.  Has supported the Freedom Party since 1986.  Joined the party's provincial executive in 1995.  Is currently a provincial officer in the party, and a member of the national executive of the Freedom Party of Canada.  In 1995, took place in a "counter-demonstration", supporting cuts to public funding by Mike Harris's government.  Member of the Canadian Taxpayers Federation.  A founder of the Alternative Parent Participating Learning Environment, APPLE ...as a local option within the public school system.  Has supported the right of figures on Canada's 'far-right' to express their views in public, presenting the issue as one of free speech.  Handed out Freedom Party paraphernalia at a "Straight Pride" parade organized by 'far-right' figures in 2000 (the event was organized as a hostile response to Gay Pride parades).  Some have linked Blair to Paul Fromm, Raphael Bergmann and other far-right figures, although there is no evidence to suggest that Blair actually endorses Fromm's opinions.  Received 404 votes, finishing sixth in a field of seven candidates.  The winner was Ernie Hardeman of the Progressive Conservative Party of Ontario.

Previous candidacies:
 1995 Ontario general election, Scarborough North, 601 votes, fourth out of six candidates (winner: Alvin Curling, Ontario Liberal Party)
 1999 Ontario general election, Oxford, 312 votes, sixth out of seven candidates (winner: Ernie Hardemann, Progressive Conservative)

Richard (Dick) Field (Parkdale—High Park)

A World War II Veteran, Richard (Dick) Field Was chairman of Voice of Canadians Committees, which later merged into the Freedom Party.  In 1994, wrote an article attacking multiculturalism as undermining Canadian values.  Also claimed that Canadian and British traditions had been dishonoured by multiculturalism.  His article was printed by the Freedom Party in 1995.  Also opposed bilingualism and political correctness.  Opposed the inclusion of a question on race on the 1996 Canadian census.  A founding member of the Montgomery Tavern Society.  Received 165 votes, finishing last in a field of eight candidates.  The winner was Gerard Kennedy of the Ontario Liberal Party.

He ran again in 2006, when the seat was vacated, and lost.

In 2012, Field opposed the Progressive Conservative nomination of Ghina Al-Sewaidi, an Iraqi-Canadian immigration lawyer.  The party later saw the nomination vacated.

Robert Smink (Perth—Middlesex)
A businessperson in London, Ontario.  Former owner of the Fabulous Forum strip club.  51 years old in 2003.  Holds a degree in Philosophy and History from the University of Waterloo (1974).  Supported Premier Mike Harris's cut to social welfare in 1995, on the grounds that the poor would be encouraged to improve their lives.  Has been president of the Freedom Party's Perth riding association.  Wrote an editorial in support of the 2003 Invasion of Iraq, referring to it as America's finest hour.  Received 384 votes, finishing last in a field of six candidates.  The winner was John Wilkinson of the Ontario Liberal Party.

Previous candidacies:
 1995 Ontario general election, Perth, 427, fourth of five candidates (winner: Bert Johnson, Progressive Conservative Party of Ontario)
 1999 Ontario general election, Perth—Middlesex, 521 votes, fifth out of five candidates (winner: Bert Johnson, Progressive Conservative)

Trueman Tuck (Prince Edward—Hastings)
Tuck is a self-described "non-lawyer legal consultant", who owns a consultation firm in Belleville, Ontario called Tuck's Professional Services.  He also owns a store in Belleville called Tuck's Discount Vitamins, and describes his products as "synthetic medicine".  He is a leader of "Friends of Freedom", and opposes the regulatory powers of Health Canada over medicines that may be sold in Canada.  Tuck petitioned for a conservative Canadian television network in 2005, and in the same year co-wrote a work entitled Death by Modern Medicine.

He defended the makers of Bell Magicc Bullet (a sexual enhancement drug) in 2003, after Health Canada ruled that the drug contains an active ingredient in Viagra and should be pulled from the market.  Tuck's argument that Health Canada was mistaken in its ruling was thrown out of court.

Tuck operates taxtyranny.ca, and other related web-sites.  Taxtyranny includes criticisms of fluoride usage, and has also included criticisms Conservative Party of Canada leader Stephen Harper for his participation at the Bilderbergers summit in 2003.  There have been a variety of other conspiracy references on the page, some involving John F. Kennedy.

Tuck is a social conservative, and unlike most others in the Freedom Party is a committed theist.  Some have criticized him as an entrist, seeking to manipulate the Freedom Party and other organizations for his own ends.

He ran in Prince Edward—Hastings as an Independent Reform candidate in the 1999 provincial election, the only such candidate in the province.  He received 133 votes, finishing seventh in a field of eight candidates.  As a Freedom Party candidate in 2003, he received 229 votes and finished last in a field of five candidates.  The winner on both occasions was Ernie Parsons of the Ontario Liberal Party.

In the 2007 provincial election, he is a running  in the same riding as one of two candidates of the Republican Party of Ontario, which he founded.

Andrew Falby (Sarnia—Lambton)
Advocate of Ayn Rand's philosophy, has references Atlas Shrugged in interviews.  Formerly a baker on a Texaco ship, later a landlord and a day renovator.  Opposes any form of rent control.  Gained local notoriety in the 1999 provincial election by making two bleating noises during a Rotary meeting.  Claimed his intent was to demonstrate that Canadians are a nation of sheep, blinding following the will of civil servants.  Wears rumpled clothing in his campaigns, and claims his concern is with changing society as a whole.  Asked about his reasons for campaigning, he once responded "I'm not doing this to win votes. I'm doing it to shock people." Asked the Sarnia city council to reduce its budget by 10% in 2004.  Has made a court application to quash the provincial anti-smoking bylaw in Lambton County. Runs a website called "The Homeless Landlords".  Received 316 votes, finishing last in a field of five candidates. The winner was Caroline Di Cocco of the Ontario Liberal Party.

Previous candidacies:
 1995 Ontario general election, Sarnia, 159 votes, sixth in a field of six candidates (winner: David Boushy, Progressive Conservative Party of Ontario)
 1999 Ontario general election, Sarnia—Lambton, 517 votes, fourth in a field of four candidates (winner: Caroline Di Cocco, Liberal)

Carol Leborg (St. Paul's)
Coordinated "Capitalism Day" in Toronto in 2002.  Has worked as a toastmaster at Toronto's Imperial Oil building.  Opposes abortion funding and supports "conscience rights" for health-care workers opposed to abortion.  Received 354 votes, finishing last in a field of five candidates.  The winner was Michael Bryant of the Ontario Liberal Party.

Lindsay George King (Thornhill)
A United Church of Canada minister in Toronto for over thirty years, overseeing the Willowdale United Church.  Retired in 1993.  Is involved in the Family Life Foundation.  Supports the LETS scheme, as promoted by John Turmel and others.  Was a founder of the Toronto LETS.  Once co-presented the "Toronto Dollar" system to former Mayor of Toronto Mel Lastman.  Ran for Turmel's Abolitionist Party of Canada in the 1993 federal election in the riding of Don Valley North, and finished last in a field of six candidates with 76 votes.  The winner was Sarkis Assadourian of the Liberal Party of Canada.  He has also run in Ontario elections in the riding of Thornhill. He received 304 votes in 2003, finishing last in a field of five candidates.  The winner was Mario Racco of the Ontario Liberal Party.  In 2007, he received 145 votes and was the last of seven candidates.

Silvio Ursomarzo (Toronto Centre—Rosedale)
Ursomarzo was born and raised in Toronto, has a Bachelor of Economics degree from York University (1988) and works in the financial services industry.  He has been involved with the Freedom Party since at least 1995, and is known to support the privatization of health care, education and housing services (Annex Gleaner, June 1999).

First ran for the Freedom Party in Trinity—Spadina in the 1999 provincial election.  Received 182 votes, finishing seventh in a field of eight candidates; the winner was Rosario Marchese of the Ontario New Democratic Party.  Received 218 votes in 2003, finishing last in a field of six candidates.  The winner was George Smitherman of the Ontario Liberal Party.

Vaughan Byrnes (Willowdale)
President of Vaughan Byrnes and Co., a family engineering business.  Opposes multiculturalism, and once described Canada's policies on immigration, multiculturalism and employment equity as "genocidal" to Canadians. A member of the Montgomery Tavern Society.  First ran for the Freedom Party in the 1999 provincial election and received 152 votes in Willowdale, finishing seventh in a field of eight candidates.  The winner was David Young of the Progressive Conservative Party of Ontario.  In 2003, received 227 votes and finished last in a field of six candidates.  The winner was David Zimmer of the Ontario Liberal Party.

The party also planned to run Gordon Mood in Algoma—Manitoulin, but he did not appear on the ballot.  Had he run, Mood would have been the party's only candidate in northern Ontario.  John Genser was also slated to run for the party in Vaughan—King—Aurora, but he too did not appear on the ballot.

References

2003